is a Japanese singer and former AV actress born in Niigata Prefecture.

Adult video career 
Kokomi Naruse made her adult video (AV) debut in 2009. She attributes her decision to enter the industry on fellow AV actress Tina Yuzuki, also known as Rio. Other names Naruse has used during her career include Cocomi, Emi Watanabe (渡邊恵美 or 渡辺恵美), Miho Sendo (仙道実穂) and Kyouko Naruse (成瀬きょうこ).

Music career 

Formed in April 2014, Naruse is currently the vocalist of Japanese band Mezcolanza (stylized as mezcolanza) and the band has released several albums.

Awards 

 2012 – Sky PerfecTV! Adult Broadcasting Awards – Best Actress Award
 2012 – Sky PerfecTV! Adult Broadcasting Awards – Nikkan Gendai Award

References

External links 
 

1989 births
Actors from Niigata Prefecture
Japanese women singers
Japanese YouTubers
Japanese pornographic film actresses
Living people
Musicians from Niigata Prefecture